Ghiasabad (also Romanized as Ghīās̄ābād and Ghasiābād; also known as Ghīyās̄ī, Qeyāsābād, and Qīās̄ābād) is a village in Now Bandegan Rural District, Now Bandegan District, Fasa County, Fars Province, Iran. At the 2006 census, its population was 685, in 199 families.

References 

Populated places in Fasa County